Charles O. Beebe (May 23, 1871March 5, 1956) was a 19th-century American Sandy Hook Pilot. He is best known for coming from a multigenerational family of Sandy Hook pilots, the son of James D. M. Beebe and grandson of Theophilus Beebe. Beebe was a World War I veteran. He served on the pilot boat Trenton, No. 4. Beebe lived in Long Branch, New Jersey, his whole life and died on March 5, 1956, at age 84.

Early life

Charles O. Beebe was born in Long Branch, New Jersey, on May 23, 1871. He was the son of James D. M. Beebe (1827-1917) and Elizabeth J. Sweeney (1845-1894). His married Margaret Ellen Jackson on September 30, 1903, in New York City. They had one child, James Dean Monroe Beebe (1885-1971) of Long Branch, New Jersey. His second marriage was to Erma D. Fesler in 1914.

Career

Captain Charles O. Beebe was a member of the Sandy Hook Pilot Association, this making the family name associated with Maritime pilots for 100 years. He started sailing with his father in the New York Harbor. During the Blizzard of 1888 he was working in a company of pilots with his father when they were shipwrecked. 

Beebe was assigned to the pilot boat Trenton, No. 4, and sailed looking for incoming steamers. On October 10, 1910, he sailed to Long Branch, New Jersey, to visit his home town. In Long Branch, he took a guest for a drive with his horse "Sunday Evening." The Trenton, had a crew of six and six apprenticeship boys under the instruction of Captain Beebe.

On September 18, 1917, his father died, at age 90, in Brooklyn, New York. He was one of its oldest Brooklyn citizens at the time of his death. He was buried at the Green-Wood Cemetery in Brooklyn. Beebe was a World War I veteran.

Beebe retired in 1935 from his job as a New York harbor pilot. He was a member of the Phil Daly Hose Company and a life member and lodge trustee of the Benevolent and Protective Order of Elks, Long Branch Lodge No. 742. On May 21, 1946, the members of the Long Branch Lodge paid tribute to Beebe, who was chairman of the lodge's House Committee, for his 75th birthday. 

His wife, Erma D. Beebe died on October 30, 1939, at their home in Long Branch. Funeral services were held at the John W. Flock Funeral Home. She was buried at the West Long Branch Cemetery.

Death

Charles Beebe died on March 5, 1956, at age 84 at the Monmouth Memorial Hospital in Long Branch, New Jersey. He lived in Long Branch his whole life. Funeral services were with the John W. Flock Funeral Home, officiated by Rev. Paul Friedrich, pastor of St. Luke's Methodist Church. He was buried at the in Woodbine Cemetery, Oceanport, New Jersey. He was survived by his son James Dean Monroe Beebe of Long Branch.

See also
 List of pilot boats and pilots.

References

 

1871 births
1956 deaths
Maritime pilotage
People from Long Branch, New Jersey
Sea captains